Emoia beryllion is a species of lizard in the family Scincidae. It is found on Rossel Island in Papua New Guinea.

References

Emoia
Reptiles described in 2018
Reptiles of Papua New Guinea
Endemic fauna of Papua New Guinea
Taxa named by Edward Frederick Kraus
Skinks of New Guinea